Alophia is a monotypic snout moth genus described by Émile Louis Ragonot in 1893. Its single species, Alophia combustella, was described by Gottlieb August Wilhelm Herrich-Schäffer in 1852. It is found in Spain, Portugal, France, Italy, Sardinia, Sicily, Greece, North Macedonia, Croatia, Hungary, Romania, Ukraine and southern Russia.

Taxonomy
The genus is sometimes listed as a subgenus of Oncocera.

References

Phycitini
Moths of Europe
Monotypic moth genera
Pyralidae genera
Taxa named by Émile Louis Ragonot